1753 Mieke is a stony Eos asteroid from the outer region of the asteroid belt, approximately 20 kilometers in diameter. It was discovered on 10 May 1934, by Dutch astronomer Hendrik van Gent at the Leiden Southern Station, annex to the Johannesburg Observatory in South Africa. The asteroid was named after Mieke Oort, wife of Dutch astronomer Jan Oort.

Orbit and classification 

The S-type asteroid is a member of the Eos family, thought to have formed from a catastrophic collision of its parent body resulting in more than 4,000 known members of the family. It orbits the Sun in the outer main-belt at a distance of 2.8–3.3 AU once every 5 years and 3 months (1,915 days). Its orbit has an eccentricity of 0.08 and an inclination of 11° with respect to the ecliptic.

As no precoveries was taken, and no prior identifications were made, Miekes observation arc begins with its official discovery observation at Johannesburg in 1934.

Physical characteristics

Lightcurves 

A rotational lightcurve of Mieke was obtained from photometric observations by Swedish astronomer Claes-Ingvar Lagerkvist analysis at Uppsala Observatory in March 1975. It gave a rotation period of 8.8 hours with a brightness variation of 0.20 magnitude. Published in March 2016, a modeled lightcurve, using the Lowell Photometric Database, gave a period of approximately 10.199 hours.

Diameter and albedo 

According to the surveys carried out by the Japanese Akari satellite and NASA's Wide-field Infrared Survey Explorer with its subsequent NEOWISE mission, Mieke measures between 19.44 and 22.08 kilometers in diameter, and its surface has an albedo between 0.144 and 0.173. The Collaborative Asteroid Lightcurve Link assumes an albedo of 0.14 and calculates a diameter of 21.40 kilometers based on an absolute magnitude of 11.1.

Naming 

This minor planet was named for Mieke Oort-Graadt van Roggen (1906–1993), wife of Dutch astronomy legend Jan Oort, who was director of the Leiden Observatory from 1945–1970. He had previously been honoured with the asteroid 1691 Oort. The official naming citation was published by the Minor Planet Center on 1 June 1980.

References

External links 
 Asteroid Lightcurve Database (LCDB), query form (info )
 Dictionary of Minor Planet Names, Google books
 Asteroids and comets rotation curves, CdR – Observatoire de Genève, Raoul Behrend
 Discovery Circumstances: Numbered Minor Planets (1)-(5000) – Minor Planet Center
 
 

001753
Discoveries by Hendrik van Gent
Named minor planets
19340510